Priory House is a Grade II Listed building in Monmouth, Wales.

First listed on 15 August 1974 it is an 18th-century building of 3 storeys, with a modern, dark red tile roof. It has had many alterations since its construction in the 18th century.

In the first part of the 19th century the building was home to the Monmouth Classical Academy which was a private boarding School. From about 1830 the Academy was run by Rev J Gosling. Fees were £20 per annum, Greek & Latin £3, Math £3, French £4, Geography £2. The Building is currently used as a private political club (Conservative).

Notes

Grade II listed buildings in Monmouthshire
Houses in Monmouth, Wales